Edward Stokes may refer to:

Edward C. Stokes (1860–1942), 32nd Governor of New Jersey, USA
Edward L. Stokes (1880–1964), U.S. Representative from Pennsylvania
Edward Stiles Stokes (1841–1901), business partner and murderer of financier James Fisk
Ed Stokes (Edward Kobie Stokes, born 1971), American basketball player

See also

 J. Ed Stokes (1888–1964), U.S. politician